Winifred Elaine "Wynne" Gibson (July 3, 1898 – May 15, 1987) was an American actress of the 1930s.

Early years
Gibson was born in New York City, the daughter of Frank W. Gibson and Elaine Coffin Gibson. Her father was an efficiency expert, and her mother was an authorized Christian Science healer. She attended Wadleigh High School for Girls in New York City. 

At one point during her youth, she ran away from home with a touring play troupe, acting with the group in three cities before her father found her.

Stage
Gibson was a member of Frederick Santley's Melody Maids and Ray Raymond's Melody Charmers. She toured in the Ritz Girls show, in which she and Billie Vernon performed a sister act. Gibson was seen in vaudeville as part of The Melody Charmers. Her Broadway credits include Jarnegan (1928) and When You Smile (1925). In 1955-56, she served as chair of the Equity Library Theatre.

Film
Early in her career, Gibson had a small part in a film but had no special interest in appearing before the camera. It was the stage that interested her and she began her stage career in chorus and was soon playing leads. She toured Europe then returned to America and tried for a dramatic part but failed and returned to musical comedy. Paramount signed her when about to film Nothing But the Truth (1929), starting her success which continued in 50 films between 1929 and 1956 although many were B movies.

Personal life
Gibson had a brief marriage to a stage manager. After that, she married John Gallaudet, an actor, in 1927. They divorced in 1930. She was a long-time companion of former Warner Brothers actress Beverly Roberts.

Death
Gibson died in 1987 of a cerebral thrombosis in Laguna Niguel, California.

Filmography

 Nothing But the Truth (1929) - Sabel Jackson
 Children of Pleasure (1930) - Emma Gray
 The Fall Guy (1930) - Lottie Quinlan
 The Gang Buster (1931) - Zella Cameron
 June Moon  (1931) - Lucille Sears
 Man of the World (1931) - Irene Hoffa
 The Stolen Jools (1931) - Reporter
 City Streets  (1931) - Agnes
 Kick In (1931) - Myrtle Sylvester
 The Road to Reno (1931) - Mrs. It-Ritch
 Ladies of the Big House (1931) - Susie Thompson
 Two Kinds of Women (1932) - Phyllis Adrian
 The Strange Case of Clara Deane (1932) - Clara Deane
 Lady and Gent (1932) - Puff Rogers
 Night After Night (1932) - Iris Dawn
 If I Had a Million (1932) - Violet Smith (uncredited)
 The Sign of the Cross (1932) - Orgy Guest (uncredited)
 The Devil Is Driving (1932) - 'Silver'
 The Crime of the Century (1933) - Freda Brandt
 Emergency Call (1933) - Mabel
 Her Bodyguard (1933) - Margot Brienne
 Aggie Appleby Maker of Men (1933) - Agnes 'Aggie' Appleby
 The Crosby Case (1934) - Lynn Ashton
 Sleepers East (1934) - Lena Karelson
 I Give My Love (1934) - Judy Blair
 The Captain Hates the Sea (1934) - Mrs. Jeddock
 Gambling (1934) - Maizie Fuller
 The Crouching Beast (1935) - Gail Dunbar
 Admirals All (1935) - Gloria Gunn
 Come Closer, Folks (1936) - Mae
 Racketeers in Exile (1937) - 'Babe' DeVoe
 Michael O'Halloran (1937) - Grace Mintum
 Trapped by G-Men (1937) - Alice Segar, Posing as Mrs. Donovan
 Gangs of New York (1938) - Orchid
 Flirting with Fate (1938) -  Bertha
 Miracle on Main Street (1939) - Sade Blake
 My Son Is Guilty (1939) - Claire Morelli
 Cafe Hostess (1940) - Annie
 Forgotten Girls (1940) - Frances Wingate
 Double Cross (1941) - Fay Saunders
 A Man's World (1942) - Blossom Donovan
 The Falcon Strikes Back (1943) - Geraldine Lipton
 Mystery Broadcast (1943) - Eve Stanley

References

External links

 Obituary in The New York Times, May 21, 1987
 Photographs and literature

1905 births
1987 deaths
20th-century American actresses
American film actresses
American television actresses
Actresses from New York City
Deaths from cerebral thrombosis